Syria competed at the 1972 Summer Olympics in Munich, West Germany. Five competitors, four men and one woman, took part in four events in three sports.

Competitors
The following is the list of number of competitors in the Games.

Athletics

Women's 800 metres – Round One
Malak El-Nasser failed to qualify the first round to semi-finals and finished last in her heat in round one.

Shooting

Two male shooters represented Syria in 1972.
Open

Wrestling

Syria nominated two male wrestlers.

Men's Greco-Roman

References

External links
Official Olympic Reports

Syria at the 1972 Summer Olympics

Nations at the 1972 Summer Olympics
1972
Olympics, Summer